The men's 10,000 metres event at the 2018 African Championships in Athletics was held on 1 August in Asaba, Nigeria.

Results

References

2018 African Championships in Athletics
10,000 metres at the African Championships in Athletics